Box Elders, a self-described "Cave Pop" band, began initially in 2005 as a goof-off project of sixteen-year-old Clayton and his fourteen-year-older brother Jeremiah McIntyre. The brothers' mother originally sang in the band, but soon quit. Eventually they started to play shows around Omaha, Nebraska. After seeing a free show, Dave Goldberg was enlisted to join and simultaneously play organs and drums. They spent much of 2008 and 2009 on the road before releasing their debut album Alice and Friends on August 11, 2009. The album's name comes from a vegan barbecue restaurant in Chicago of the same name. They embarked on a tour of the United States in October 2009 with labelmates Jay Reatard and Nobunny and in March 2010 with Black Lips. Box Elders began an indefinite hiatus in 2010.

Musical style

The band is influenced by 1960s rock and roll, punk rock, conspiracy theories, the DIY ethic, Coast to Coast AM and the John Peel Sessions. The band is known for making short, but catchy songs about an interesting array of topics including walking ("One Foot in Front of the Other"), the end of the world ("2012"), goblins ("Alice & Friends"), a childhood hippie neighbor who hunted with Ted Nugent ("Ronald Dean") and necrophilia ("Necro").

Band members

Current line-up
Jeremiah McIntyre - vocals, guitar -
Clayton McIntyre - vocals, guitar
Dave Goldberg - drums, keyboards

Discography

Albums
Alice and Friends, 2009, Goner Records

7 Inch Records
Box Elders 7", 2008, Grotto Records
Box Elders - Hozac Hookup Klub 7", 2010, HoZac Records

References

External links
Box Elders official band web site
Box Elders Merchandise site

Musical groups from Nebraska